The Portland Pilots is the nickname for athletics at the University of Portland. The Pilots compete in the West Coast Conference (WCC) at the NCAA Division I level.

History 
The Pilots started to gain attention when Clive Charles began coaching the women's soccer team in 1989. He already had been the men's soccer coach since 1986, and he continued to coach both teams until his death in 2003. He was replaced by Bill Irwin. The women's soccer team won national championships in 2002 and 2005 and were led by numerous national-level players (see "notable alumni athletes" section). Additionally, the men's soccer team has been to the College Cup twice in its history: 1988 and 1995.

In addition to soccer, UP consistently has one of the top cross country programs in the nation. Their men's team, coached by Rob Conner, won their 34th overall West Coast Conference championship in October 2014. The men's team has qualified for the NCAA Men's Division I Cross Country Championship a total of eighteen times, making their first appearance in 1993. The team has finished among the top 10 eight times in its history. The Pilots placed 7th in 2001, 2008, and 2013. The Pilots finished 3rd in 2014 and 2018 as well as 2nd in 2017, which was their highest ever finish. In 2008, David Kinsella finished 4th overall, the highest any Pilot has ever placed individually at the national championships. The men's team has won the NCAA West Regional four times in their history: in 1993, 2017, 2018, and 2019. Through 2017, a total of eighteen Pilots have earned All-American honors in cross country, including Scott Fauble, Alfred Kipchumba, Trevor Dunbar, Pete Julian, Uli Steidl, Joe Driscoll, Reid Buchanan, and John Moore. Rob Conner also heads the Pilots' Indoor and Outdoor Track & Field teams, and has coached 25 All-Americans in distance events ranging from the mile to the 10,000m run. Several Pilots have competed at the U.S. Olympic Trials under coach Conner, including William "Woody" Kincaid in the 5,000m in 2016, and John Moore and Michael Kilburg in 10,000m in 2008.

The Pilots have had limited success in other sports. The men's basketball team has gone to the NCAA tournament twice (1959 and 1996). Their women's basketball team has gone to the NCAA Tournament four times (1994-1997), qualified for the cancelled 2020 NCAA Tournament, and participated in the WNIT three times (1998, 2009, and 2022). Their baseball team has also gone to the NCAA tournament five times (1957, 1958, 1979, 1989, and 1991). Their volleyball team also made the postseason for the first time in 2018 after qualifying for the National Invitational Volleyball Championship.

UP has not fielded a football team since 1950.

Sports sponsored

Former teams 
Football (discontinued after 1950)
Men's and women's golf (discontinued after 2011)

National championships
NCAA team championships
Women's soccer (2): 2002, 2005
 
Other team championships
NAIA Women's Cross Country (1): 1985

Conference championships
The Pilots compete in the West Coast Conference, which they joined in 1976. Below are a few of their conference titles:
Men's Basketball WCC Tournament Champions (1): 1996 
Men's Baseball Pacific-10 Conference Northern Division Tournament (2): 1989, 1991
Men's Cross Country (34): 2014, 2012, 2010, 2009, 2008, 2007, 2006, 2005, 2004, 2003, 2002, 2001, 2000, 1999, 1998, 1997, 1996, 1995, 1994, 1993, 1992, 1991, 1990, 1989, 1988, 1987, 1986, 1985, 1984, 1983, 1982, 1981, 1980, 1979
Men's Golf (2): 1993, 1985
Men's Soccer (6): 2016, 2002, 1992, 1990, 1989, 1988
Men's Tennis Regular Season (1): 2017
Women's Basketball WCC Tournament Champions (3): 2023, 2020, 1994; Regular Season Champions (3): 1997, 1996, 1992
Women's Cross County (20): 2016, 2008, 2007, 2006, 2005, 2004, 2003, 2002, 2000, 1999, 1998, 1997, 1996, 1994, 1993, 1992, 1991, 1989, 1988, 1987
Women's Soccer (13): 2013, 2010, 2009, 2008, 2007, 2005, 2004, 2000, 1997, 1996, 1995, 1994, 1992

Venues

The Portland Pilots play home soccer matches at Merlo Field, part of the Clive Charles Soccer Complex. All volleyball and basketball games are held in the Chiles Center. The baseball team plays in Joe Etzel Field. The Louisiana-Pacific Tennis Center is home to the tennis teams.

Olympians
Yari Allnutt, men's soccer, United States: 1996 Summer Olympics
Conor Casey, men's soccer, United States: 2000 Summer Olympics
Kasey Keller, men's soccer, United States: 1996 Summer Olympics
Stephanie Lopez, women's soccer, United States: gold medalist in 2008 Summer Olympics
Michelle French, women's soccer, United States: silver medalist in 2000 Summer Olympics
Woody Kincaid, men's track and field, United States: 2020 Summer Olympics
Shannon MacMillan, women's soccer, United States: gold medalist in 1996 Summer Olympics, silver medalist in 2000 Summer Olympics
Derek Mandell, men's track and field, Guam: 2008 Summer Olympics, 2012 Summer Olympics
Tiffeny Milbrett, women's soccer, United States: gold medalist in 1996 Summer Olympics, silver medalist in 2000 Summer Olympics
Megan Rapinoe, women's soccer, United States: gold medalist in 2012 Summer Olympics, 2016 Summer Olympics, bronze medalist in 2020 Summer Olympics
Sophie Schmidt, women's soccer, Canada: 2008 Summer Olympics, bronze medalist in 2012 Summer Olympics, bronze medalist in 2016 Summer Olympics, gold medalist in 2020 Summer Olympics
Christine Sinclair, women's soccer, Canada: 2008 Summer Olympics, bronze medalist in 2012 Summer Olympics, bronze medalist in 2016 Summer Olympics, gold medalist in 2020 Summer Olympics
Joshua Illustre, men’s track and field  Guam: 2016 Summer Olympics

Notable alumni athletes

Yari Allnutt, US men's international soccer player
Emmett Barrett, American football player
Larry Beil, American football player
Conor Casey, US men's international soccer player
Pat Casey, head coach of the Oregon State baseball team
Steve Cherundolo, soccer player and assistant manager for Hannover 96
Christina Francisco, runner who represents Guam internationally (current student)
Rocky Gale, catcher in the San Diego Padres organization
Nate Jaqua, soccer player who last played for Seattle Sounders FC
Pooh Jeter, basketball player for the Sacramento Kings in 2010–11
Kasey Keller, US men's international soccer player and TV analyst
Woody Kincaid, US men's Olympic long distance runner
Bill Krueger, former MLB player and TV analyst
Stephanie Lopez, US women's international soccer player
Shannon MacMillan, US women's international soccer player
Benji Michel, soccer player for Orlando City SC
Tiffeny Milbrett, US women's international soccer player
Heath Pearce, US men's international soccer player
Megan Rapinoe, US women's international soccer player
Elli Reed, soccer player for Seattle Reign FC
Luis Robles, US men's international soccer player and goalkeeper for New York Red Bulls
Sophie Schmidt, Canadian international soccer player
Ray Scott, former 1st round draft pick of the Detroit Pistons
Christine Sinclair, Canadian international soccer player and all-time leader in international goals for either sex
Garrett Smith, head coach of the women's soccer team
Erik Spoelstra, head coach of the Miami Heat
Keelin Winters, soccer player for Seattle Reign FC

Gallery

See also
 Portland Pilots men's basketball
 Portland Pilots women's basketball
Portland Pilots men's soccer

References

External links
 

 
Pilots